Marine Aviation Training Support Group 22 (MATSG-22) is a  United States Marine Corps aviation training group that was originally established during World War II as Marine Aircraft Group 22 (MAG-22).  Squadrons from MAG-22, were decimated at the Battle of Midway and after reconstituting fought during the Battle of Okinawa.  The group was deactivated following the end of the war and were not reactivated until May 1, 2000, when the Marine Aviation Detachment at Naval Air Station Corpus Christi, Texas was renamed MATSG-22.

History

MAG-22 History 
In early January 1942, Lieutenant Colonel William J. Wallace arrived at Midway Atoll to take command of the Marine Aircraft Group 21 (MAG-21) Midway detachment.  At that time, the detachment contained VMSB-231 and VMF-221 both of which had arrived on Christmas Day 1941 flying off of the USS Saratoga (CV-3).  On March 1, 1942, MAG-21's Midway detachment was commissioned as Marine Aircraft Group 22, initially composed of VMF-221, VMF-222, VMSB-241, and VMSB-242 (VMF-222 and VMSB-242 would later be transferred off of the island on April 12, 1942). From its inception, until several months after the war, the group did not serve within the continental limits of the United States, hence it earned the popular name of "Foreign Legion of Marine Aviation". 

The first enemy plane shot down by a MAG-22 aircraft occurred on March 10, 1942, when a 4-plane section from VMF-221, piloted by Capt. James L. Neefus, 1stLt. Francis P. McCarthy, 1stLt. Charles W. Somers Jr., and MarGun. Robert L. Dickey, engaged a Japanese Kawanishi H6K 45 miles from Midway Atoll.  Upon their return, the Marine Aircraft Group commander presented a bottle of bourbon to the pilots for their efforts, and were later formally awarded by Admiral Chester W. Nimitz.

Major Ira L. Kimes assumed command of the group on April 19, 1942, which he would lead through the Battle of Midway. For his leadership in the pivotal battle, he was awarded the Navy Distinguished Service Medal.

Defense of Midway 
On June 4, 1942, Midway Atoll, defended by VMF-221 and VMSB-241, came under attack by the Imperial Japanese Navy. VMF-221, in two sections led by Major Floyd B. Parks and Captain Kirk Armistead, flying the Brewster F2A-3 Buffalo and Grumman F4F-3 Wildcat constituting a force of 25 aircraft, flew to intercept the incoming Japanese Midway Attack Force of 108 aircraft. In the ensuing 15 minute engagement, 32 enemy aircraft were shot down; however, of the 25 Marines that went into battle, only 10 would return and only two of the aircraft would remain operational.

Meanwhile, VMSB-241, also split into two sections led by Major Benjamin W. Norris and Major Lofton R. Henderson flying the Vought SB2U Vindicator and Douglas SBD-2 Dauntless, flew to attack the approaching Japanese Naval Striking Force. Through their efforts, the squadron was able to damage the Japanese aircraft carrier Akagi, at the loss of 16 aircraft and crew, including those of the two Majors leading the attack. The following day, the squadron launched a second attack on several damaged Japanese cruisers, once again as two sections, led by Captain Marshall A. Tyler and Captain Richard E. Fleming. Captain Tyler's attack bracketed the Mogami with 6 near misses, causing topside damage to the ship. As Captain Fleming pressed his attack on the Japanese cruiser Mikuma, his aircraft was struck and set aflame by anti-aircraft fire. Despite the severe damage inflicted on his aircraft, he maintained his course, achieving a near-miss before crashing into the sea. For his actions, he was posthumously awarded the Congressional Medal of Honor. Fleming's rear gunner and radioman, Private First Class George A. Toms, was posthumously awarded the Distinguished Flying Cross.

Outnumbered overall 2:1 in inferior aircraft with far less training than their enemy, the Marines successfully defended Midway. MAG-22 aircraft downed 43 of the 108 enemy aircraft: 25 Aichi D3A "Val" dive-bombers and 18 Mitsubishi A6M Zeros. The group also damaged three Japanese ships. All of this success in combat came at a great cost. Of the 52 aircraft that intercepted Japanese forces, only 20 returned. Including the Marines in the MAG's ground echelon, casualties totaled 7 killed in action, 35 missing in action (presumed dead), and 25 wounded in action. Over 50 Marines were awarded for their valor, skill, and leadership in defending the island, and MAG-22 was awarded the Presidential Unit Citation. Shortly after the end of the battle, Admiral Nimitz perfectly summarized the significance of the Marine defenders in the following dispatch to the MAG:

Marshall Islands 
MAG-22 remained on Midway conducting routine patrol missions until February 8, 1944, joining the 4th Marine Base Defense Air Wing (later 4th MAW) at Eniwetok Atoll, arriving on Engebi island February 19. At that time composed of VMF-113, VMF-422, and VMF(N)-533, flying the Vought F4U Corsair and Grumman F6F Hellcat, the group served a variety of missions across the many Atolls of the Marshall Islands.

VMF-133 covered landings at Ujelang Atoll, and contributed to the neutralizations of Wotje Atoll, Maloelap Atoll, and Mili Atoll.
VMF-422 was sent to Roi-Namuron May 27 to conduct interdiction missions against Japanese bases and shipping in the islands. The squadron hosted Charles Lindbergh during this time, who accompanied them on three strike missions against Wotje Atoll in September. Additionally, the squadron's ground echelon did extensive ground work to prepare Engebi Island for operational use.
VMF(N)-533 was responsible for night defense operations over Eniwetok.

Combat over Ponape 
Ponape, 367 miles southwest of Eniwetok, was an enemy supply center for the Marshalls and Carolines. On March 28, a flight of six Corsairs of VMF-113 escorted four Army Airforce B-25's of the 48th Bomber Squadron over the island. The flight came under attack by 12 Japanese aircraft, which the Marines effectively fended off. With zero losses suffered, eight enemy aircraft were shot down and one aircraft was destroyed on the ground. The blow was so severe, that no enemy air forces were encountered for the remainder of the campaign.

The air-to-air kills were credited as follows: 
Major Everton (CO) [2]
Captain Frank C. Drury [1]
Lieutenant Joe V. Schellack [2.5]
Lieutenant Emmet O. Anglin [1]
Lieutenant Bernard A. Nelson [0.5]
Master Sergeant Peter Tunno [1].

VMF-422 launched additional strike missions against the island during March, April, and on October 16, 1944.

Battle of Okinawa 
On May 25, 1945, MAG-22 (now reinforced with VMF-314 and VMTB-131) was added to the Tactical Air Force, Tenth Army (TAF), as part of 2nd MAW.  The ground echelon arrived at Ie Shima on May 6, joined by the flight echelon May 21, where they operated from until July 16. The Japanese air arm, specifically kamikazi attacks, was considered the biggest threat to the success of the invasion; therefore, the TAF's top priority was maintenance of air superiority over the objective and the 5th Fleet.

Of note were the Kikusiu raids; ten large kamikaze attacks carried out by the Imperial Japanese Army. On May 24–25, after Japanese planes had bombed the Ie Shima airfield, and plenty of night fighting handled by VMF(N)-533, a 165-plane kamikaze attack was launched in an attempt to knock out the radar pickets and ships just off shore. VMF-422 scored their first 6 kills during this engagement. Despite shooting down many enemy aircraft, 11 American ships were sunk or damaged. Only two days later occurred the longest single alert of the Okinawa campaign lasting 9 hours 16 minutes. A total of approximately 150 enemy aircraft attempted to sink more ships. Marine pilots downed 32 aircraft; however, ten ships were damaged with one sunk.
The last of the raids happened on June 21–22. Marine night fighters downed 6 enemy aircraft; however, the two days of fighting also produced the following Navy Cross action of First Lieutenant John W. Leaper of VMF-314:

While VMTB-131's primary mission was antisubmarine operations, it also assisted in resupply. After the 1st Marine Division and 77th Infantry Division captured Shuri Castle, very heavy rains flooded supply routes, making them completely impassible, leaving troops critically low on food and ammunition. Heavy clouds obscured the location of the ground forces, but the front line air liaison parties coached them in. Over 763 drops were made by Marine pilots, with 163 credited to VMTB-131, led by Major Douglas A. Bangert.

MAG-22 squadrons flew 22,912 combat hours, fought air-to-air duels, protected against kamikaze attacks, contributed to the execution of approximately 40% of all close air support missions, and 637 downed Japanese aircraft (506 of which were shot down by Marine units) with only 41 aircraft lost. VMF-113 was credited with 12 enemy aircraft downed, VMF-314 with 14 aircraft downed, VMF-422 with 15 aircraft downed, and VMTB-131 with one aircraft downed.  VMF(N)-533, once again conducting night operations, was responsible for 35 enemy aircraft shot down, the most of any night fighter squadron during the war, and suffered zero operational losses. Six of these were by a single pilot, Captain Robert Baird, who was the only Marine night ace of the war. For his service, he received the Navy Cross, Silver Star, and Distinguished Flying Cross.

MAG-22 received a second Presidential Unit Citation, being one of the subordinate units to 2nd Marine Aircraft Wing which was cited for the award.

With Okinawa secured, the MAG began flying out to Omura on Kyushi and then to Sasebo, where Colonel Elliott Bard embarked it for the United States. On December 5, 1945, MAG-22 saw the United States for the very first time; since Midway 1942, it had exclusively served on Pacific islands.

Marine Aerial Navigation School history 
Aerial navigation training first began for the Marine Corps in 1942 when five Marine officers were assigned to the Weems School Of Navigation in Annapolis, Maryland. After completing this course, these five officers became the nucleus who established the navigation school at Camp Kearny in San Diego, California. A year later the school was moved to Marine Corps Air Station Cherry Point, North Carolina where they graduated their first class of navigators in January 1945. This training program existed only as a ground school.  In March 1948 the school was disbanded.

In March 1952 after the beginning of the Korean War, the Aerial Navigation School was reactivated as part of the Airborne Operation School located at MCAS Cherry Point. The Airborne Operation School consisted of the Aerial Navigation School, Radio Operator School and the Electronic Countermeasures School. During this time Marine Navigators trained in such aircraft as C-54s, R4D-6s, and R4D-8s (Super DC-3). The Aerial Navigation School remained at Cherry Point until January 1971 at which time it was moved to Naval Air Station Pensacola, Florida, where the Navy assumed responsibility for flight support. A detachment of T-29 aircraft from VT-29 NAS Corpus Christi, which had been previously assigned for Navy support, now provided flight support for the Aerial Navigation School. At this point the name of the school was changed to the Marine Aerial Navigation School (MANS).

After two years at Naval Air Station Pensacola, the Navy moved the detachment of T-29s and the Marine School moved to NAS Corpus Christi in order to continue the T-29 support. Due to the phasing out of the T-29s in 1976 at Corpus Christi, the Marines of MANS were then relocated to Mather Air Force Base, CA, where they utilized the T43 aircraft. In January 1993, MANS was once again relocated to Randolph AFB, TX.
Marine instructors utilizing the 12th Flying Training Wing navigation training facilities staff the Marine Aerial Navigation School (MANS). The command mission of the Marine Aerial Navigation School is to train and qualify enlisted Marines in the "Scientific Art of Navigation" and as Navigators of tactical transport aircraft in support of the Fleet Marine Force.

2000 – present 
In May 2000, the Commandant of the Marine Corps directed the re-designation of Marine Aviation Detachment NAS Corpus Christi as Marine Aviation Training Support Group 22.  All Marine Aviation Training Support Groups were redesignated to promote a sense of Marine Corps identity and tradition and allows them and their history to live on.

Awards 
 Presidential Unit Citation with two silver bands
 Asiatic-Pacific Campaign Medal with three bronzes stars
 Navy Occupation Service Medal with Asia clasp

MAG-22 Battle of Midway Navy Cross Recipients

See also 

 United States Marine Corps Aviation
 List of United States Marine Corps aircraft groups

Notes
This article incorporates text in the public domain from the United States Marine Corps.

References
Bibliography

External links 
 MATSG-22's official website
 Documentary detailing MAG-22's WWII service

Tr
Military units and formations in Texas